Beijerinckia doebereinerae is a bacterium from the genus of Beijerinckia.

References

External links
Type strain of Beijerinckia doebereinerae at BacDive -  the Bacterial Diversity Metadatabase

Beijerinckiaceae
Bacteria described in 2009
Martinus Beijerinck